The Mayor of Papakura was the head of the municipal government of Papakura, New Zealand, and presided first over Papakura Borough (1938–1975), then Papakura City (1975–1989), and finally Papakura District (1989–2010). The mayor was directly elected using a First Past the Post electoral system.

History
Papakura City was constituted as a city on 1 January 1975. It existed until the 1989 local government reforms, when "Papakura City" was subsumed by "Papakura District". Papakura District was abolished on 31 October 2010, when the area became part of the Auckland Region, governed by the Auckland Council.

The 2007 mayoralty (and the last one before the advent of the Super City) was contested by Calum Penrose, the incumbent John Robertson, and Brent Catchpole. They received 5386, 3985 and 757 votes, respectively. Penrose was thus elected.

List of mayors of Papakura
The following persons served as mayor of Papakura:

References

 
Papakura